Belgium national racquetball team represents the Belgian Racquetball Federation in racquetball international competitions. Is a member of the European Racquetball Federation since 1985 and International Racquetball Federation. Ireland has won the European Championships 9 times in women's competition, 7 times in overall's and 5 in men's competition.

History

Players
National team in the European Championship 2009

References

External links
BRF Belgian Racquetball Federation

National racquetball teams
Racquetball
Racquetball in Belgium